Gatineau Hull-Volant is a Canadian Junior ice hockey team based in Gatineau, Quebec.  They play in the National Capital Junior Hockey League.

History
The Express have joined the league for the 2006-07 season.  The team, originally from Sainte-Cécile-de-Masham, Quebec, took the name La Pêche Express from the sports complex they played out of near Lac La Pêche on the Ontario-Quebec border.

In Summer 2009, the Express moved to Aylmer, Quebec.

For the 2012-2013 season, the team took a break and did not participate that season. The Express' players were given an opportunity to try out and play with other teams in the National Capital Junior Hockey League with a condition that they would return the following season.

In March 2013, the Gatineau Express announced their return to the NCJHL. The team will now be playing their home games at the Robert Guertin Centre in Gatineau, QC.  They soon after changed their name to the Jr. Olympiques and during the summer of 2015 re-branded to the Gatineau Hull-Volants.

Season-by-season record
Note: GP = Games Played, W = Wins, L = Losses, T = Ties, OTL = Overtime Losses, GF = Goals for, GA = Goals against

Individual player awards

The only Express player so far to receive an individual award has been Léandre Gagné Lemieux. After a quick step in the Quebec Junior AAA league  at the beginning of the season, he bounced to La Pêche who was in a year of transition. The team was not very competitive but young Gagné Lemieux managed to keep an average of more than 2 points per game. He finished that year third in the league's leading scorers.

External links
Gatineau Hull-Volant 

Eastern Ontario Junior C Hockey League teams
Ice hockey teams in Quebec
Ice hockey in Gatineau
Ice hockey clubs established in 2006
2006 establishments in Quebec